Gérard Daniel Westendorp (8 March 1813, The Hague – 31 January 1869, Dendermonde) was a Dutch born, Belgian military physician and botanist.

He studied medicine at the Ecole de Médecine de Bruxelles, later working as a student-physician in Antwerp. Around 1834, he became a naturalized citizen of Belgium, subsequently serving as an assistant army and navy physician, later spending his career as a "regular doctor" in the Belgian army.

As a botanist, he specialized in cryptogamic flora, being the co-publisher (with A.C.F. Wallays) of a cryptogamic exsiccatae series of Belgium. He also made significant contributions towards the "Prodromus Florae Batavae" project (1850-1866). In the field of zoology, he published a treatise on Bryozoa and sponges of Belgium.

Westendorp's botanical specimens are preserved in the Jardin Botanique National de Belgique.

Selected works 
 Herbier cryptogamique, ou, Collection des plantes cryptogames et agames qui croissent en Belgique (with A.C.F. Wallays), 1845-1859. (exsiccata)
 Notices sur quelques cryptogames, 1851-1863. 
 Polypiers flexibles de la Belgique. Collection des bryozaires, sertulaires, flustres & spongiaires qu'on rencontre en Belgique, et particuliérement aux environs d'Ostende, 1853.
 Les cryptogames : classes d'apres leurs stations naturelles, 1854.
 Description de quelques Cryptogames inédites ou nouvelles pour la flore des deux Flandres, 1863.

References 

1813 births
1869 deaths
19th-century Belgian botanists
Belgian mycologists
Physicians from The Hague
Scientists from The Hague